State of Bacon is a 2014 mockumentary written and directed by Jason Cook, and produced in conjunction with the Blue Ribbon Bacon Festival. It postulates that bacon is one of the most popular foods in the world, and covers the world's largest bacon festival, the founders, and the people that attend.

Summary
Featuring the Iowa Bacon Board as they put on the world's largest bacon festival. As people descend on the adult festival, including kids, local news reporters, Icelandic Vikings who want to compete for the world's greatest bacon, and PETA, it demonstrates that bacon brings us all together, even those who don't eat it.

Cast
David Anthony Higgins 
"Hacksaw Jim" Duggan 
Chuck Grassley (United States Senator from Iowa) 
Terry Branstad (Governor of Iowa)
Andy Fales (reporter for KDSM-TV)

Premiere
The film has an "invitation only" premiering on May 15, 2014, in Des Moines, Iowa, at the Fleur Cinema & Cafe, with public showings until May 22.

References

External links

 State of Bacon at the Internet Movie Database
 "Blue Ribbon Bacon Festival"
CNN coverage of production
Digital Cuvee, production company website

2014 documentary films
2014 films
Bacon
Films about food and drink
American mockumentary films
2010s English-language films
2010s American films